Chenga Assembly constituency is one of the 126 assembly constituencies of Assam Legislative Assembly. Chenga forms part of the Barpeta Lok Sabha constituency

Town Details

Following are details on Chenga Assembly constituency-

Country: India.
 State: Assam.
 District: Barpeta district.
 Lok Sabha Constituency: Barpeta Lok Sabha/Parliamentary constituency.
 Assembly Categorisation: Rural constituency.
 Literacy Level:65.03%.
 Eligible Electors as per 2021 General Elections: 1,45,053 Eligible Electors. Male Electors:75,102 . Female Electors: 69,946 .
 Geographic Co-Ordinates: 26°13'51.6"N 91°06'23.4"E.
 Total Area Covered: 380 square kilometres.
 Area Includes: Tarabari thana and Nowgaon mouza in Barpeta thana in Barpeta sub-division, of Barpeta district of Assam.
 Inter State Border :Barpeta.
 Number Of Polling Stations: Year 2011-150,Year 2016-152,Year 2021-47.

Members of Legislative Assembly 

Following is the list of past members representing Chenga Assembly constituency  in Assam Legislature.

 1967: A. R. Chowdhury, Indian National Congress.
 1972: Abdul Hannan Choudhury, Indian National Congress.
 1978: Danesh Ali Ahmed, Indian National Congress.
 1983: Danesh Ali Ahmed, Indian National Congress.
 1985: Mukhtar Hussain, Independent.
 1991: Liakat Ali Khan, Independent.
 1996: Sukur Ali Ahmed, Indian National Congress.
 2001: Sukur Ali Ahmed, Indian National Congress.
 2006: Liakat Ali Khan, Asom Gana Parishad.
 2011: Sukur Ali Ahmed, Indian National Congress.
 2016: Sukur Ali Ahmed, Indian National Congress.
 2021: Ashraful Hussain, All India United Democratic Front.

Election result

2016 result

References

External links 
 

Assembly constituencies of Assam